Kevin Neilson "Noofa" Roberts (born 11 April 1939) is a former Australian rules footballer who played with St Kilda in the Victorian Football League (VFL) during the 1960s.

Roberts was recruited from Cheltenham, where he played as a full-back winning a Federal League best and fairest. A left footer, he became a half forward flanker at St Kilda and kicked three goals in a narrow semi final loss to Melbourne at the MCG in 1963. He often played on the half forward flank next Darrel Baldock. He came off the bench as a reserve in the 1965 VFL Grand Final loss to Essendon, strangely enough wearing number 24 in this match instead of his usual number 23. After kicking 17 goals in his first eight games in the 1966 VFL season, Roberts broke his collarbone against Melbourne and as a result missed the premiership win.

He also played for Oakleigh in the Victorian Football Association (VFA) after retiring from StKilda.
Roberts returned to Cheltenham Football Club and played until 35 years old. 

Later he returned to the St Kilda Football club as a player development officer, helping young recruits the likes of Tony Lockett and Rod Owen. He also served as a senior runner for Alex Jesaulenko and Tony Jewell the early 1980s and for Darrel Baldock in 1987.

References

Holmesby, Russell and Main, Jim (2007). The Encyclopedia of AFL Footballers. 7th ed. Melbourne: Bas Publishing.

1939 births
Living people
St Kilda Football Club players
Australian rules footballers from Victoria (Australia)